In 1903, the Motor Car Act, which mandated the registration of motor vehicles, became law. It took effect on 1 January 1904, though the first number plates were issued in late 1903. The A1 registration plate was issued by London county council in December 1903 to the second Earl Russell. It was the first registration issued by the London County Council, though other authorities started before that date. From surviving records, the first number known to have been issued is Hastings' DY 1 issued on 23 November 1903.

In 1906, the plate was sold to the Chairman of the London County Council along with the registration and the car it belonged to, a Napier. In 1907, the head of the Maudes Group Motor Business, George Pettyt, bought the plate, and was successively transferred to each of his personal cars over the years.

After Pettyt's death in 1950, his Sunbeam Talbot 90 which bore the plate was bequeathed to a Trevor Laker, with the condition that Laker sell the plate and the proceeds be given to a dogs' charity.  The plate was sold for £2,500 and the money donated to The Guide Dogs for the Blind Association. In 1970, the Dunlop company took ownership and rights to the plate, which was put onto a Daimler limousine that was used to transport VIPs to and from the Dunlop factories. The plate was used for a brief period on the Director of Engineering's car, a Mini.  The tyre division later took ownership and it was used for promotional purposes, including the marketing of the Denovo "fail-safe" wheels.

In 1985, BTR plc gained the "A 1" plate after it acquired Dunlop.  The company's headquarters in Birmingham placed it on a Ford Granada. In 2000, the plate was bought by Jefri Bolkiah after its sale by Insignia Registrations alongside the plate, "1 A".  The plates were placed on matching, white Bentley Azures.

As of 16 March 2023, the A1 registration plate was assigned to a black Mini.

References

Vehicle registration plates of the United Kingdom